Saint-Yvi (before September 2005: Saint-Yvy) is a commune in the Finistère department of Brittany in north-western France.

Population
Inhabitants of Saint-Yvi are called in French Saint-Yviens. The population has been increasing quickly since the year 1975.

Geography

Historically, the town belongs to Cornouaille. The river Jet forms its northern border.

Map

See also
Communes of the Finistère department

References

External links

Mayors of Finistère Association 

Communes of Finistère